The 2009 1000 km of Algarve (1000 km do Algarve) was the third round of the 2009 Le Mans Series season.  It took place at the Autódromo Internacional do Algarve, Portugal, and was held over the night starting on 1 August 2009 and ending in the early morning of 2 August.

Race Report

Qualifying

Qualifying result
Pole position winners in each class are marked in bold.

Race report

Race results
Class winners in bold.  Cars failing to complete 70% of winner's distance marked as Not Classified (NC).

References

External links
 Le Mans Series - 1000 km do Algarve

Algarve
Algarve
1000 km of Algarve